Mindil Beach Casino & Resort is a casino in Darwin, Northern Territory, Australia, owned and operated by Delaware North. It is the only casino in Darwin.

History

Don Casino (1979–83)
The first casino in Darwin, and the second in Australia, operated at the Don Hotel, Cavenagh Street, and was granted a licence as the "Don Casino" in 1979.

Mindil Beach Casino (1983–85)
The licence was in 1983 transferred to the Mindil Beach Casino. In 1984, the Territory government forcibly acquired it, along with the Alice Springs Casino, from Federal Hotels for $50 million. A joint venture between Greate Bay Casino Corp. (owner of the Sands Atlantic City) and Aspinall Holdings (a British casino operator) was set up to operate the two casinos.

Diamond Beach Hotel and Casino (1985–95)
The Mindil Beach Casino was renamed as the Diamond Beach Hotel and Casino. Aspinall bought out Greate Bay's interest for US$1 million in 1986, and then acquired the territorial government's 17 percent interest for $5 million in 1987.

MGM Grand Darwin (1995–2004)
In 1995, MGM Grand acquired the property for US$75 million, including US$13 million of assumed debt. It was renamed as the MGM Grand Darwin.

SkyCity Darwin (2004–2019)
The SkyCity Entertainment Group purchased the hotel in 2004 for $195 million and took ownership on 23 July 2004.

Mindil Beach Casino & Resort (2019–present)
Skycity sold the hotel to American company Delaware North in April 2019 for $188 million. Delaware North changed the property's name to Mindil Beach Casino & Resort to reflect one of its original names and its modern resort facilities.

References

External links

1983 establishments in Australia
Casinos completed in 1983
Hotels established in 1983
Buildings and structures in Darwin, Northern Territory
Casinos in Australia
Tourist attractions in Darwin, Northern Territory